Gaston County is a county in the U.S. state of North Carolina. As of the 2020 census, the population was 227,943. The county seat is Gastonia. Dallas served as the original county seat from 1846 until 1911.

Gaston County is included in the Charlotte-Concord-Gastonia, NC-SC Metropolitan Statistical Area. It is the fourth largest county in the metropolitan area, behind Mecklenburg County, York County and Union County as of the 2018 US Census estimates. It is located in the southern Piedmont region.

The county has fifteen incorporated towns. In addition to fifteen incorporated towns and cities, there are several unincorporated communities such as Hardin, Lucia, Crowders Mountain, Sunnyside, Alexis, Tryon, and North Belmont.

History
The earliest European settlers of Gaston County were principally Scots Irish, Pennsylvania Dutch, and English. In the 1750s, Dutch settler James Kuykendall with Robert Leeper, and others constructed a Fort at the Point at the junction of the Catawba and South Fork Rivers. The fort was built because of ongoing hostilities with the Cherokee, but it was apparently never attacked. Tensions between the settlers and the Native American inhabitants (primarily of the Catawba tribe) were eased considerably when the boundary dispute between North Carolina and South Carolina was settled in 1772, after which most of the Catawba settled on a reservation near Fort Mill, South Carolina.

Most early farms in the area were small, cultivated primarily by white yeoman farmers of English ancestry. North Carolina's colonial policy restricted the size of land grants, and in Gaston County they tended to be about  each. One of the earliest grants in the area was given to Captain Samuel Cobrin, commander of a local militia company, on September 29, 1750.

Gaston County was founded in 1846, partitioned from Lincoln County. It is named for William Gaston, a U.S. Representative from North Carolina and member of the state supreme court.

Between 1845 and 1848, Gaston County experienced an industrial boom. During this three-year period, the first three cotton mills in the county were established. Some sources claim that the first one was established by Thomas R. Tate on Mountain Island, near the present site of Duke Energy's Mountain Island Dam and Hydroelectric Station. Other sources say that the first mill was established by the Linebergers and others on the South Fork River near McAdenville. Most sources agree that among the first three mills in operation in the county was the Stowesville Mill, founded by Jasper Stowe and associates in the South Point Community south of Belmont. Gaston County still leads all other counties in the country both in the number of spindles in operation and in the number of bales of cotton consumed.

The county seat moved from Dallas to Gastonia in 1911.

Geography

It belongs to the southern Piedmont physiographic province.

Most of Gaston County is in the drainage basin of the Catawba River, except for small areas along the western edge of the county which are in the basin of the Broad River. Both the Catawba and Broad Rivers are in the greater Santee River basin. The Catawba forms the eastern border of the county and much of the central part of the county is in the drainage basin of its right tributary, the South Fork Catawba River. The county is located in the Piedmont region of central North Carolina, which consists of gently rolling terrain frequently broken by hills, river and creek valleys, and low, isolated mountain ridges.

State and local protected areas/sites 
 Crowders Mountain State Park
 Mountain Island Educational State Forest (part)
 Seven Oaks Preserve Trail

Major water bodies 
 Beaverdam Creek
 Catawba Creek
 Catawba River
 Crowders Creek
 Little Beaverdam Creek
 Mountain Island Lake
 Rankin Lake
 South Crowders Creek
 South Fork Catawba River
 South Stanly Creek
 Stanly Creek

Adjacent counties
Lincoln County - north
Mecklenburg County - east
York County, South Carolina - south
Cleveland County - west

Transportation and infrastructure

Major highways

 
 
 
 
 
 
 
 
  (Business route)

Rail service
Gaston County is served by Amtrak, with a stop in Gastonia.  Freight rail service is provided by the Norfolk Southern Railway, CSX and Patriot Rail.

The Norfork Southern main line passes from west to east across the county, passing through Kings Mountain, Bessemer City, Gastonia, Ranlo, Lowell, Cramerton and Belmont.  From Gastonia, a branch line leads south to Crowders.

CSX rail lines pass through the northwestern and northeastern corners of Gaston County.  In the northwest, a line between Lincolnton and Shelby passes through Cherryville.  In the northeast, a line between Lincolnton and Charlotte passes through Stanley and Mount Holly.

Progressive Rail operates state-owned trackage between Gastonia and Mount Holly with a spur extending to Belmont.

Airports
Charlotte-Douglas International Airport is a major, full-service airport with passenger flights. It is across the Catawba River in Mecklenburg County in Charlotte.

The city of Gastonia owns and operates Gastonia Municipal Airport, which is a general aviation airport with a single runway, Runway 3/21, an asphalt runway that is 3,779 feet in length.

Demographics

2020 census

As of the 2020 United States census, there were 227,943 people, 85,705 households, and 55,868 families residing in the county.

2004
As of the census of 2004, there were 194,459 people, 73,936 households, and 53,307 families residing in the county. The population density was 534 people per square mile (206/km2). There were 78,842 housing units at an average density of 221 per square mile (85/km2). The racial makeup of the county was 83% White, 13.9% Black or African American, 0.3% Native American, 1% Asian, 0% Pacific Islander, 0.3% from other races, and 1% from two or more races. 3.00% of the population were Hispanic or Latino of any race.

There are 92,094 males and 98,271 females in Gaston County. Of these 39,492 are under 15, 23,082 are aged 16–24, 59,096 are aged 25–44, 44,710 are aged between 45–64 and 23,985 are 65 and over. The median age is 36.89 years.

The median income for a household in the county was $39,482, and the median income for a family was $46,271. Males had a median income of $33,542 versus $23,876 for females. The per capita income for the county was $19,225.  About 8.30% of families and 10.90% of the population were below the poverty line, including 14.50% of those under age 18 and 11.10% of those age 65 or over.

Law and government
Gaston County is governed by a seven-member Board of Commissioners.  Two members are elected from Gaston Township and one each from the other five townships of Gaston County. They are elected on a partisan basis to four-year staggered terms. Those that file for a particular seat must live in the township. However, the vote is countywide or "at-large."

The offices of Sheriff, District Attorney, Clerk of Superior Court, and Register of Deeds are also elected offices, elected on a countywide, partisan basis. Gaston County currently is divided into forty-six (46) voting precincts.

The county is administered by a full-time professional County Manager. Gaston County is a member of the regional Centralina Council of Governments.

County officers

Board of Commissioners

Soil & Water Conservation District Board Members

Superior court judges

District court judges

Other offices

North Carolina General Assembly

North Carolina Senate

North Carolina House of Representatives

Federal offices

Senate

House of Representatives

Courts of law
North Carolina has a unified statewide and state-operated court system, called the General Court of Justice. It consists of three divisions: appellate courts, superior courts, and district courts. In Gaston County, there is also a small claims Court.

Small claims court handles civil cases where a plaintiff requests assignment to a magistrate and the amount in controversy is $5,000 or less. There is no jury and usually no lawyers. A person who loses in small claims court may appeal for a trial by jury before a judge in district court. Magistrates are appointed for two-year terms by the senior resident superior court judge upon nomination of the clerk of superior court.

Politics

Economy
Piedmont Lithium is a mining company currently in the process of proving economic mineral recovery of lithium in Gaston County. After five years of surface prospecting, the company began drilling many sample cores in 2021 across  of land it owns or has mineral rights to the county proving economic viability of mining lithium for the boom in battery demand to support electric vehicle and other uses.

Education
Public education in Gaston County is administered by the Gaston County Schools public school system. The system is governed by the nine-member Gaston County Board of Education which sets policy and establishes guidelines for school operations.  Board members are elected on a nonpartisan, county wide basis, with seven representatives chosen from the six townships and two members selected at-large. Gaston County Schools has 54 public schools, including 9 high schools, 11 middle schools, 32 elementary schools, one alternative school (middle and high school age), and one separate school (Webb Street School in Gastonia) serving students ages 3 to 22 with moderate to severe disabilities.

Gaston County has four charter schools: Community Public Charter School (K-7) in Stanley, Ridgeview Charter School (K–4) in Gastonia, Piedmont Community Charter School (K–12) in Gastonia, and Mountain Island Charter School (K–8) in Mount Holly.

There are two colleges in Gaston County. Gaston College is a community college located in Dallas offering associate degree, Certificate, and Diploma programs. Belmont Abbey College is a Roman Catholic Liberal Arts College located in Belmont.

The Gaston County Public Library has 10 branches spread throughout the county.

Natural heritage
Gaston County's most significant natural heritage sites are distributed across the county.  They range from Crowders Mountain in the southwest corner to sites east of Stanley and at the mouth of the South Fork Catawba River.

Gaston County has twelve natural heritage sites listed as being of state or regional significance. Six of these are listed because of the presence of the bigleaf magnolia (Magnolia macrophylla). This magnificent plant has the largest simple leaf of any species in the temperate world, and one of the largest flowers. Of the 34 known sites containing bigleaf magnolias in North Carolina, 29 are in Gaston County.

Two sites are important because they provide habitat for the bog turtle (Glyptemys muhlenbergii). The bog turtle is the single most significant rare animal species surviving in Gaston County.

Crowders Mountain State Park is the largest natural heritage site in the county. Six natural plant communities are found in the park, and the area supports a diversity of wildlife species. Some animals documented in the park have not been documented elsewhere in the county. A second natural heritage site, Pinnacle Road, has recently been incorporated into the park. This site is most significant for the occurrence of dwarf juniper (Juniperus communis) along its ridgeline.

The Stagecoach Road site is the largest and best preserved granitic outcrop in the county. Its thin soils are dominated by hickory species and it is also home to several smaller species such as Talinum teretifolium (fame flower), Diamorpha smallii (Small's sedum), and Hypericum gentianoides (pineweed) that are found only in this type of habitat.

Another 25 sites are listed as being of local significance. Two of these are home to extremely rare plants. Catawba Cove, near the Daniel Stowe Botanical Garden, supports a stand of Schweinitz's sunflower (Helianthus schweinizii), a federally endangered species. The Armstrong Ford site near Belmont is the only place in western North Carolina (and one of only two sites in the state) where magnolia vine (Schisandra glabra) has been found.

Points of interest 
The Hoyle Historic Homestead, with notable German-American construction features, is the oldest extant structure in Gaston County.  Located on the Dallas-Stanley Highway above the South Fork Catawba River, it was built around 1760 and is listed on the National Register of Historic Places.

The Gaston County Museum is located in the town of Dallas, North Carolina.

The Schiele Museum of Natural History is a science museum and planetarium located in Gastonia that features both permanent and touring exhibits.

Crowder's Mountain State Park is noted for its resident raptors and sheer vertical cliffs which drop .

The U.S. National Whitewater Center is a recreation and training facility. Set among  of wooded land along the Catawba River, the multiuse facility has a climbing center, mountain-biking trails and running trails.

Christmas Town USA - McAdenville, North Carolina - Each December, hundreds of thousands of twinkling lights turn this small mill town into a spectacular holiday display. Visitors stroll down Main Street surrounded by the sights and sounds of Christmas.

Spencer Mountain, which is located in central Gaston County, is the site of the old WBTV television transmitter.  It was from this site that the first commercial television signal in North Carolina was broadcast, when WBTV signed on the air in 1949.  The tower remains on the mountain today, but is no longer in use as WBTV's primary transmitter.  It is used by NWS for its NOAA Weather Radio transmission signal.

Communities

Cities
 Belmont
 Bessemer City
 Cherryville
 Gastonia (county seat and largest city)
 Kings Mountain (mostly in Cleveland County)
 Lowell
 Mount Holly

Towns

 Cramerton
 Dallas
 Dellview (inactive)
 High Shoals
 McAdenville
 Ranlo
 Spencer Mountain
 Stanley

Townships
 Cherryville
 Crowders Mountain
 Dallas
 Gastonia
 Riverbend
 South Point

Unincorporated communities

 Alexis
 Ashebrook Park
 Boogertown
 Brown Town
 Crowders
 Hardins
 Lucia
 Mountain Island
 South Gastonia
 Springdale
 Tryon

See also
 List of counties in North Carolina
 National Register of Historic Places listings in Gaston County, North Carolina
 North Carolina State Parks
 List of North Carolina state forests

References

External links

 
 
 Gaston Regional Chamber of Commerce
 Gaston County Schools official website
 NCGenWeb Gaston County - free genealogy resources for the county

 
Charlotte metropolitan area
1846 establishments in North Carolina
Populated places established in 1846